Powell County is a county located in the U.S. Commonwealth of Kentucky. As of the 2020 census, the population was 13,129. Its county seat is Stanton. The county was formed January 7, 1852, by Kentucky Governor Lazarus W. Powell from parts of Clark, Estill, and Montgomery counties. It is no longer a dry county as of 2018. Powell County is home to Natural Bridge State Resort Park and the Red River Gorge Geologic Area, two of Kentucky's most important natural areas and ecotourism destinations, as well as the Pilot Knob State Nature Preserve.

Geography 

Adjacent counties
 Montgomery County  (north)
 Menifee County  (northeast)
 Wolfe County  (southeast)
 Lee County  (south)
 Estill County  (southwest)
 Clark County  (northwest)

National protected area
 Daniel Boone National Forest (part)

Government
The Powell County courthouse is located at 525 Washington St in Stanton.
 County Judge-Executive: Eddie Barnes
 County Clerk: Jackie Everman
 Sheriff: Danny Rogers
 Coroner: Megan Wells Curtis
 Jailer: Teddy Lacy
 County Attorney: Robert King
 Circuit Clerk: Brian King
 County Property Valuation Administrator (PVA): Carmen Rogers
 County Surveyor: Vacant
 EMS Director: Nathan Hall

Demographics 

As of the census of 2000, there were 13,237 people, 5,044 households, and 3,783 families residing in the county. The racial makeup of the county was 98.56% White, 0.62% Black or African American, 0.12% Native American, 0.05% Asian, 0.07% from other races, and 0.58% from two or more races. 0.66% of the population were Hispanic or Latino of any race.

There were 5,044 households, out of which 36.10% had children under the age of 18 living with them, 58.20% were married couples living together, 12.40% had a female householder with no husband present, and 25.00% were non-families. 21.80% of all households were made up of individuals, and 8.30% had someone living alone who was 65 years of age or older. The average household size was 2.60 and the average family size was 3.02.

In the county, the population was spread out, with 26.60% under the age of 18, 9.50% from 18 to 24, 30.00% from 25 to 44, 23.30% from 45 to 64, and 10.60% who were 65 years of age or older. The median age was 35 years. For every 100 females there were 99.40 males. For every 100 females age 18 and over, there were 95.00 males.

The median income for a household in the county was $25,515, and the median income for a family was $30,483. Males had a median income of $26,962 versus $18,810 for females. The per capita income for the county was $13,060. About 18.90% of families and 23.50% of the population were below the poverty line, including 31.00% of those under age 18 and 20.00% of those age 65 or over.

Politics
In recent federal elections, Powell County has been reliably Republican.

Natural Bridge State Resort Park
Powell County is home to Natural Bridge State Resort Park. The park is abundant with Native American relics, shelters, and burial grounds.

Communities
 Clay City
 Slade
 Stanton (county seat)

See also

 National Register of Historic Places listings in Powell County, Kentucky

References

External links
 Powell County School District
 Powell County Tourism

 
Kentucky counties
Counties of Appalachia
1852 establishments in Kentucky
Populated places established in 1852